Sylwester Stefan Pawłowski (born 13 September 1958 in Łódź) is a Polish politician. He was elected to the Sejm on 25 September 2005, getting 12469 votes in 9 Łódź district as a candidate from the Democratic Left Alliance list.

See also
Members of Polish Sejm 2005-2007

External links
Sylwester Pawłowski - parliamentary page - includes declarations of interest, voting record, and transcripts of speeches.

1958 births
Living people
Politicians from Łódź
Polish United Workers' Party members
Democratic Left Alliance politicians
Members of the Polish Sejm 2005–2007
Councillors in Łódź